Hail Creek is a rural locality in the Isaac Region, Queensland, Australia.

Geography
The Hail Creek coal mine is within the locality. It is operated by Glencore Australia.

Road infrastructure
The Suttor Developmental Road (State Route 11) runs through from south-east to south-west.

References 

Isaac Region
Localities in Queensland